North Morowali Regency is a regency in the province of Central Sulawesi, Indonesia. The regency was established on 12 April 2013, partitioned from the northwestern districts of Morowali Regency. It covers an area of 10,004.28 km2 and the component districts had a combined population of 104,094 at the 2010 Census. The new regency had 120,789 inhabitants at the 2020 Census - comprising 62,965 male and 57,824 female; the official estimate as at mid 2021 was 122,240. The principal town lies at Kolonodale.

Administrative Districts 
The North Morowali Regency was divided (following its separation from Morowali Regency in 2013) into seven districts (kecamatan), but three further districts (Lembo Raya, Petasia Timur and Petasia Barat) were created. These are all tabulated below with their areas and their populations at the 2010 Census and the 2020 Census, together with the official estimates as at mid 2021. The table also includes the location of the district headquarters, the numbers of administrative villages (rural desa and urban kelurahan) in each district, and its postal codes.

Notes: (a) the 2010 population of Lembo Raya District is included in the figure for Lembo District from which it was cut out in 2013. (b) the 2010 populations of Petasia Timur District and Petasia Barat District are included in the figure for Petasia District from which they were cut out in 2013. (c) including 44 offshore islands. (d) including 15 offshore islands.

References

External links 
 Official website of North Morowali Regency

 
Regencies of Central Sulawesi